HPAO may refer to:

 AOC3, Amine oxidase, copper containing 3 (vascular adhesion protein 1)
 N1-acetylpolyamine oxidase, an enzyme